The 2022–23 season is the 136th season in the existence of Wycombe Wanderers Football Club and the club's second consecutive season in League One. In addition to the league, they will also compete in the 2022–23 FA Cup, the 2022–23 EFL Cup and the 2022–23 EFL Trophy.

Transfers

In

Out

Loans in

Loans out

Pre-season and friendlies

On 24 June, Wycombe announced three behind-closed-doors practise matches against Fulham U23s, Oxford City and Watford. Along with four XI friendlies against Bracknell Town, Aylesbury United, Chesham United and Worthing. 2 Days later, Wycombe announced a Friendly against Premier League side AFC Bournemouth at Brockenhurst FC.

Competitions

Overall record

League One

League table

Results summary

Results by round

Matches

On 23 June, the league fixtures were announced.

FA Cup

On 17 October, Wycombe Wanderers were drawn at home to Walsall in the first round.

EFL Cup

Wycombe were drawn away to Northampton Town in the first round. After beating Northampton Town 2–1, they were drawn at home to Bristol City in the second round.

EFL Trophy

On 20 June, the initial Group stage draw was made, grouping Wycombe Wanderers with Peterborough United and Stevenage. These fixtures were confirmed on 4 July 2022.

Berks & Bucks FA Senior Cup 

As one of three EFL clubs competing in the Berks & Bucks FA Senior Cup, alongside Milton Keynes Dons and Reading, Wycombe Wanderers entered the competition in the quarter-finals. Wycombe Wanderers were drawn against either Southern Football League Premier South Division side Bracknell Town or Newport Pagnell Town of the United Counties League Premier Division South. Bracknell Town won the second-round tie to set up a quarter final with Wycombe Wanderers.

Statistics

Appearances and goals

{{Extended football squad player|no=13|name=Tyla Dickinson|pos=GK|nat=ENG |4|0|0|0|2|0|1|0}}

|-
|colspan="12"|Players who left the club before the end of the season:''

|}

References

External links

Wycombe Wanderers F.C. seasons
Wycombe Wanderers F.C.